Carex concinnoides is a species of sedge known by the common name northwestern sedge. It is native to western North America from British Columbia to California, where it can be found in moist or dry habitat, often in woodland and forested slopes, on silty and clay soils. This sedge produces loose clumps of stems up to about 35 centimeters in maximum height from long rhizomes. The leaves are thick but narrow, sickle-shaped, and pale green in color. Inflorescences occur at the stem tips, and some pistillate inflorescences grow from nodes along the stem. The spikelets have purplish bracts. The pistillate flowers have four stigmas on each pistil, an identifying characteristic. The fruit is coated in a sac called a perigynium, which is white to light brown in color, purple-tipped, and covered in hairs.

External links
Jepson Manual Treatment
USDA Plants Profile
Flora of North America
Photo gallery

concinnoides
Flora of Alberta
Flora of British Columbia
Flora of the Northwestern United States
Flora of California
Plants described in 1906
Flora without expected TNC conservation status